Ian Read is an English neofolk and traditional folk musician, and occultist active within chaos magic and Germanic mysticism circles.

Read was a member of Sol Invictus, and founded Fire + Ice in 1991.

Early life
Read left school at 16, and at the age of 17, he became an adherent of Germanic neopaganism and began studying Germanic paganism.

Music career
In 1987, Read joined Tony Wakeford's Sol Invictus along with Karl Blake. Read recorded three albums and an EP with Sol Invictus before leaving to form the band Fire + Ice in 1991.

Ian Read founded an all traditional folk band named Figg's Academy that played a couple of gigs, notably in 2008 at the Wave-Gotik-Treffen in Leipzig.

Fire + Ice
Read founded Fire + Ice in 1991 after several years as a member of Sol Invictus. According to their sole website, "The heartlessness of the modern commercial consumer society ruins the lives of many. FIRE + ICE takes the purity and philosophy of early music and melds it into a message redolent with powerful seeds of honour, truth, loyalty and the bond of true friendship."

His work as Fire + Ice have had a large amount of influence on neofolk music.

The band played Wave-Gotik-Treffen in Leipzig in 1999 with a lineup that included Ysanne Spevack and Julia Kent.

The band followed up by releasing a split 7-inch single with the neofolk song The Unquiet Grave recorded in London in 2000, featuring vocals and viola by Ysanne Spevack as a duet with Ian Read. It was released in Germany by Tesco Distribution on blue vinyl with a letterpress foil gatefold cover.

Other pursuits
In 1996, Read was named as a Rune-Master within the Rune-Gild. His master work was the Fire + Ice album Rûna that included a self-written and sung galdor (or galdr) of the Rune poem. Read presently holds the position of Drighten in the Rune Gild and co-published the periodical Rûna, which ceased after 24 issues.

Read became the leader of the English branch of the Illuminates of Thanateros (IOT), in the early 1990s after founder Peter Carroll stepped down as leading Magus. Read is currently the editor of the IOT's Chaos International.

Discography

With Current 93
He participated to the sessions of Current 93's album Swastikas For Noddy, therefore he appears on this album and some subsequent albums containing remixes of this material:
 Swastikas For Noddy, 1987
 Looney Runes, 1988
 Earth Covers Earth, 1988
 Crooked Crosses For The Nodding God, 1989
 Swastikas For Goddy, 1993

With Death In June
He participated to Death in June's album Brown Book and the tracks have appeared in subsequent Death In June's releases as well:
 Brown Book, 1987
 The Cathedral Of Tears , 1991
 Braun Buch Zwei, 2009

With Sol Invictus

 Lex Talionis, 1990
 Sol Veritas Lux, 1990, compilation of the tracks from the EPs Against the Modern World (1988) and In The Jaws Of The Serpent (1988)
 Trees In Winter, 1990

With Fire + Ice

Albums

EPs

Videos

Compilations

See also
Neopagan music

References

External links
Detailed Ian Read discography at discogs.com

Living people
Chaos magicians
English folk musicians
English occultists
Year of birth missing (living people)
English modern pagans
Adherents of Germanic neopaganism
Performers of modern pagan music
Sol Invictus (band) members